Gary Delaney (born 16 April 1973) is an English writer and stand-up comedian. His style of humour is one-liners involving puns. He is known for delivering them in a slightly deadpan manner.

Early life
Gary Delaney received a degree in Economics from the London School of Economics, owing to his childhood desire to be a bond trader.

Career
Before his comedy career, Delaney fixed photocopiers, worked at banks, and did custodian work at garages.

He writes for Birmingham-based FM radio station Kerrang! 105.2 and also appeared in the horror-comedy film Trash House. A lot of his material was allegedly plagiarised on the humour website Sickipedia. When Delaney complained, the site removed the material and replaced it with a notice saying "joke removed due to a copyright complaint by Gary Delaney" and a link to his website. He received abuse and death threats from the site's users. However, his actions led the website to begin to attribute authorship of the jokes appearing on its site.

In 2003, Delaney toured the UK supporting Jerry Sadowitz, performing at venues including Manchester University and Shepherd's Bush Empire, London. His first Edinburgh Festival Fringe show, Purist, won generally positive reviews, including four stars from comedy website Chortle, and The Independent newspaper. Delaney had two of his gags included in the top ten of the third annual Dave Award for the Funniest Joke of the Fringe, the only comedian to do so. Following an increased profile due to appearances on Mock the Week and Dave's One Night Stand, Delaney toured Purist in 2013.

In July 2012, Delaney appeared on Mock the Week. Some residents of Jersey were offended when he joked that people from Jersey were "trying to shake off their tax avoidance tag and get back to their traditional reputation as Nazi sympathisers." The BBC, however, reiterated that Mock the Week contains irreverent humour and that the comment was "obviously tongue-in-cheek".. Delaney went on to make a total of 18 appearances on the show.

Contributing to the topical podcast No Pressure to be Funny, in May 2013, he described himself as a "right-wing libertarian".

Personal life
Delaney began a relationship with fellow stand-up comedian  Sarah Millican in 2006. The couple moved in together in 2013 and married in December 2013.

As of February 2015, Delaney lived in Cheshire.

References

External links

Interview with Gary Delaney (2011) at Giggle Beats

1973 births
Living people
English male comedians
English libertarians
Comedians from Birmingham, West Midlands
21st-century British comedians